Ottankadu is a village in the Pattukkottai taluk of Thanjavur district, Tamil Nadu, India.

Demographics
As per the 2001 census, Ottankadu had a total population of 3289 with 1624 males and 1665 females. The sex ratio was 1025. The literacy rate was 64.92.

References

 

Villages in Thanjavur district